Kepez is a small village in Silifke district of Mersin Province, Turkey. It is situated in Taurus Mountains. The population of the village was 91 as of 2012. The main economic activities are farming and animal husbandry.

References

Villages in Silifke District